Sun Air is a private airline based in Khartoum, Sudan. As of October 2021, according to its website, Sun Air  operates scheduled domestic flights between Khartoum and several domestic destinations. It also operates scheduled international flights between Khartoum and other cities in Africa and the Middle East.

Overview
The airline, is family owned and started operations in June 2008 with a fleet of one Airbus A310-300 aircraft, and three Boeing 737-200 aircraft. As of October 2021, the airline operates Embraer E-190, Airbus 330-200 and Airbus A321 aircraft.

Fleet
As of September 2021, the Sun Air fleet consisted of the following aircraft.

Previous fleet
In the past, Sun Air has operated the following aircraft:

Destinations
According to the airline's website, the airline maintains regular passenger service to the following domestic and international destinations: With consultation assistance from Lufthansa Consulting, a subsidiary of the German aniline Deutsche Lufthansa AG, Sun Air is actively pursuing the opening of routes to Uganda, Nigeria, Lebanon, Saudi Arabia and Syria.

See also

 List of airlines in Sudan

References

External links
Sun Air Group Homepage

Airlines of Sudan
Companies based in Khartoum
Airlines established in 2008
2008 establishments in Sudan